Hagen is a borough of Neustadt am Rübenberge in the district of Hanover, Lower Saxony in Germany. It had a population of 1,440 in 2021.

Transportation
Hagen has a railway station and is served by line S2 of the Hanover S-Bahn.

References

Neustadt am Rübenberge
Villages in Lower Saxony